La Madera is the name of two populated places in the U.S. state of New Mexico:

 La Madera, Rio Arriba County, New Mexico
 La Madera, Sandoval County, New Mexico